Final Solution is a 2001 film set in South Africa based on the real-life stories of Gerrit Wolfaardt and Moses Moremi, with themes of morality, tolerance, and forgiveness. Written and directed by Cristóbal Krusen, the title of the film comes from the Nazi Final Solution which was the inspiration of a plan with an apartheid motive in the film.

Krusen said that the idea for making a film in South Africa first came to him in 1988 during the filming of Ropa Nueva para Felipe in Mexico. He made numerous trips to South Africa during the 1990s to observe firsthand race relations in the country and seek material for a story that would demonstrate radical transformation from hatred to love between former enemies.

Cast
 John Kani as  Rev. Peter Lekota 
 Jan Ellis as   Gerrit Wolfaardt 
 Langley Kirkwood as Pieter  
 David S. Lee as  Jan Oosthuizen  
 Mpho Lovinga as  Moses Moremi 
 Bruce Marchiano as  Jake 
 Regardt van den Bergh as  Gerber 
 Liezel van der Merwe as  Celeste 
 Marius Weyers as  Mr. Wolfaardt

External links
 
From One Blood - Garrit Wolfhaardt

Apartheid films
2001 films
2001 drama films
English-language South African films
Afrikaans-language films
Films shot in South Africa
South African drama films